The men's mass start at the 2016 KNSB Dutch Single Distance Championships in Heerenveen took place at Thialf ice rink on Tuesday 29 December 2015. There were 29 participants. This mass start event was the first time that it was officially part of he Dutch national speed skating championships.

Result

Source:

Referee: Hanjo Heideman. Starter: Jan Zwier. Start: 18:27 hr. Finish: 18:43  hr.

References

Single Distance Championships
2016 Single Distance